Deena Lynn Wigger (born August 27, 1966) is a retired American sport shooter, she is the daughter of the Olympic shooter Lones Wigger. She placed 10th in the 10 m air rifle shooting event at the 1988 Summer Olympics.

Wigger won a total of four gold medals at the Pan American Games in 1983–1995. She also won one gold, two silver and two bronze medals at the 1986 and 1990 World Championships. In 1989 she broke the world record for air rifle with 389 of 400.

Wigger attended college at Murray State University in Kentucky, helping them win an NCAA team championship. After the 1988 Olympics, she joined the Wyoming Air National Guard, and then the US Air Force, where she served as a medical technician and an assistant shooting coach at the US Air Force Academy. In 1996 she was named the United States Air Force Athlete of the Year.

References

1966 births
Living people
ISSF rifle shooters
American female sport shooters
Shooters at the 1988 Summer Olympics
Olympic shooters of the United States
Sportspeople from Great Falls, Montana
Pan American Games medalists in shooting
Pan American Games gold medalists for the United States
Pan American Games bronze medalists for the United States
Shooters at the 1995 Pan American Games
Shooters at the 1987 Pan American Games
Shooters at the 1983 Pan American Games
United States Air Force Athlete of the Year
Medalists at the 1983 Pan American Games
Medalists at the 1987 Pan American Games
Medalists at the 1995 Pan American Games
21st-century American women
20th-century American women